Hero to Zero is a British children's drama television show about a young boy named Charlie Brice who has many adventures while receiving advice from footballer Michael Owen. The six-part series premiered 23 February 2000, on BBC One.

Cast
Huw Proctor  – Charlie Brice
Michael Owen  – Himself
Ian Burfield  – Jimmy Brice
Angela Simpson  – Rachel Brice
Angela Bruce  – Mrs. Vaughn
Fo Cullen  – Teresa
Alan Ford  – Ron Warley
Elliot Frost  – Dean
Niall Gallagher  – Eamon
Jane Hazlegrove  – Miss Horsborough
Terence Hillyer  – Keith
Johnny Jhooti  – Jeetan
Steven Law  – Luca
Steven Loveridge  – Roberto
Robert Lupton  – Barry
Julie Mccahill  – Angela
Julius Mngadi  – Carl
Ryan Moore  – Chris
Cathy Murphy  – Janice
Cliff Parisi  – Vic Morrish
Sophie Reed  – Kelly
Renay Richardson  – Sade
Joshua Rideout  – Jonathan Morrish
Matthew James Thomas  – Ben
Farist Uter  – Rafet
Scott Walker – Kid that Got Nutmeged

References

External links
 

2000 British television series debuts
2000 British television series endings
BBC children's television shows
Fictional association football television series